For the 2009–10 season, Fußball-Club St. Pauli competed in the 2. Bundesliga.

Transfers

Summer Transfers

In:

Out:

Winter Transfers

In:

Players

Appearances and goals
Appearance and goalscoring records for all the players who are in the St. Pauli first team squad during the 2009–10 season.

|}

2. Bundesliga

ResultsNote: Results are given with St. Pauli score listed first.DFB-Pokal

ResultsNote: Results are given with FC St Pauli score listed first.''

References

FC St. Pauli seasons
Saint Pauli